The Education Act 1996, is a Malaysian laws which enacted to provide for education and for matters connected therewith.

Preamble
Preamble of the Act provides the following acknowledgements:
WHEREAS acknowledging that knowledge is the key determinant of the destiny and survival of the nation:
AND WHEREAS the purpose of education is to enable the Malaysian society to have a command of knowledge, skills and values necessary in a world that is highly competitive and globalized, arising from the impact of rapid development in science, technology and information:
AND WHEREAS education plays a vital role in achieving the country’s vision of attaining the status of a fully developed nation in terms of economic development, social justice, and spiritual, moral and ethical strength, towards creating a society that is united, democratic, liberal and dynamic:
AND WHEREAS it is the mission to develop a world-class quality education system which will realize the full potential of the individual and fulfill the aspiration of the Malaysian nation:
AND WHEREAS the National Education Policy is based on the National Philosophy of Education which is expressed as follows:
“Education in Malaysia is an ongoing effort towards further developing the potential of individuals in a holistic and integrated manner so as to produce individuals who are intellectually, spiritually, emotionally and physically balanced and harmonious, based on a firm belief in and devotion to God. Such an effort is designed to produce Malaysian citizens who are knowledgeable and competent, who possess high moral standards, and who are responsible and capable of achieving a high level of personal well-being as well as being able to contribute to the betterment of the family, the society and the nation at large”:
AND WHEREAS the above policy is to be executed through a national system of education which provides for the national language to be the main medium of instruction, a National Curriculum and common examinations; the education provided being varied and comprehensive in scope and which will satisfy the needs of the nation as well as promote national unity through cultural, social, economic and political development in accordance with the principles of Rukunegara:
AND WHEREAS it is considered desirable that regard shall be had, so far as is compatible with that policy, with the provision of efficient instruction and with the avoidance of unreasonable public expenditure, to the general principle that pupils are to be educated in accordance with the wishes of their parents

Structure
The Education Act 1996, in its current form (1 January 2012), consists of 16 Parts containing 156 sections and 1 schedule (including 2 amendments).
 Part I: Preliminary
 Part II: Administration
 Part III: National Education Advisory Council
 Part IV: Education System
 Chapter 1—The National Education System
 Chapter 2—Pre-School Education
 Chapter 3—Primary Education
 Chapter 4—Secondary Education
 Chapter 5—Post Secondary Education
 Chapter 6—Other Educational Institutions
 Chapter 7—Technical Education and Polytechnics
 Chapter 8—Special Education
 Chapter 9—Teacher Education
 Chapter 10—Religious Teaching in Educational Institutions
 Chapter 11—Management of Educational Institutions
 Chapter 12—Provision of Facilities and Services
 Part V: Assessment and Examination
 Part VI: Higher Education
 Part VII: Private Educational Institutions
 Part VIII: Registration of Educational Institutions
 Chapter 1—Registration of Educational Institutions
 Chapter 2—Cancellation of Registration
 Chapter 3—Registration of Governors and Employees
 Chapter 4—Registration of Pupils
 Chapter 5—Inspection of Educational Institutions by the Registrar General
 Part IX: Registration of Teachers
 Chapter 1—Registration of Teachers
 Chapter 2—Permits to Teach
 Chapter 3—Miscellaneous
 Part X: The Inspectorate of Schools
 Chapter 1—The Inspectorate
 Chapter 2—General
 Part XI: Finance
 Part XII: Appeals
 Part XIII: Regulations
 Part XIV: Offences and Penalties
 Part XV: Miscellaneous
 Part XVI: Transitional and Repeal
 Schedule

See also
Education Act

References

External links
 Education Act 1996 

1996 in Malaysian law
Malaysian federal legislation
History of education in Malaysia